The Udya or Udzha ( or Уджа; , Ucaa) is a river in Yakutia (Sakha Republic), Russia.

The river flows north of the Arctic Circle, in the northern limits of the Central Siberian Plateau and the North Siberian Lowland. The area is lonely and desolate, devoid of settlements. The Beyenchime-Udzha interfluve is an area where diamonds are found.

Course  
The Udya is the third largest tributary of the Anabar. Its sources are in the vicinity of the sources of the Bur, Buolkalakh and the Beyenchime of the Olenyok basin. It is formed at the confluence of rivers Tokur-Udya and Mas-Udya in an area of lakes. It heads roughly northwestwards all along its course. Finally it joins the right bank of the Anabar  from its mouth. The confluence is not far upstream from Saskylakh. 

The river is fed by rain and snow. It is frozen between early October and late May / early June.

Fauna
The Udya river is rich in fish species, including broad whitefish, humpback whitefish and peled, among others.

See also
List of rivers of Russia

References

External links 
Schematic map of ancient terrains and kimberlitic fields in the Siberian craton
Fishing & Tourism in Yakutia

Rivers of the Sakha Republic
North Siberian Lowland